Chandlerella is a genus of nematodes belonging to the family Onchocercidae.

The species of this genus are found in Malesia and Northern America.

Species:

Chandlerella bosei 
Chandlerella hispanica 
Chandlerella quiscali
Chandlerella sinensis 
Chandlerella stantschinskyi

References

Nematodes